Korolev is an ice-filled impact crater in the Mare Boreum quadrangle of Mars, located at 73° north latitude and 165° east longitude. The crater was named after Sergei Korolev (1907–1966), the head Soviet rocket engineer and designer during the Space Race in the 1950s and 1960s.

Korolev crater is located on the Planum Boreum, the northern polar plain which surrounds the north polar ice cap, near the Olympia Undae dune field.

Ice formation
The ice is permanently stable because the crater acts as a natural cold trap. The thin Martian air above the crater ice is colder than air surrounding the crater; the colder local atmosphere is also heavier so it sinks to form a protective layer, insulating the ice, shielding it from melting and evaporation. Recent research indicates that the ice deposit formed in place within the crater and was not previously part of a once-larger polar ice sheet. The ice in the crater is part of the vast water resources at Mars poles.

See also 
 1855 Korolev, minor planet
 Korolev (lunar crater)

References

External links 
  (Animated; ESA; June 30, 2020)

Impact craters on Mars
Mare Boreum quadrangle
Sergei Korolev
Water on Mars